Adina-Ioana Vălean (born 16 February 1968 in Băicoi, Prahova County, Romania) is a Romanian politician who has been serving as European Commissioner for Transport under the leadership of President of the European Commission Ursula von der Leyen since 2019.
She previously served as a Member of the European Parliament from 2007 until 2019, where she chaired of the European Parliament Committee on Industry, Research and Energy in 2019.

Education
Vălean has a master's degree in European Integration and Security Studies, postgraduate studies in National Security and Defence Management and a bachelor's degree in mathematics.

Political career

Career in national politics
A member of the National Liberal Party (PNL), and a member of the  European Peoples Party, Vălean was elected to the Chamber of Deputies on the Justice and Truth list for Călărași County (during the 2004 elections).

Member of the European Parliament, 2007–2019
Vălean became a Member of the European Parliament on 1 January 2007, with the accession of Romania to the European Union. Throughout her time in parliament, she served on the Committee on Industry, Research and Energy; in 2019, she became the committee's chairwoman. During her time on the committee, she was the Parliament's rapporteur for the Connecting Europe Facility (CEF) and the European Union roaming regulations.

From 2014 to 2017, Vălean was one of the Vice-Presidents of the European Parliament under the leadership of President Antonio Tajani; in that capacity, she was in charge of information and communications technology (ICT). She also chaired the Committee on the Environment, Public Health and Food Safety from 2017 until 2019 and served on the Committee on Petitions from 2009 until 2014.

In addition to her committee assignments, Vălean was part of the Parliaments delegations with the countries of Southeast Europe (2007–2009); the Euronest Parliamentary Assembly (2009–2014); and the United States (since 2014). She was also a member of the Transatlantic Legislators' Dialogue (TLD); the European Internet Forum; and the European Parliament Intergroup on Long Term Investment and Reindustrialisation.

European Commissioner for Transport, 2019–present
In November 2019, the center-right government under Prime Minister Ludovic Orban put Vălean and Siegfried Mureșan forward as candidates to be the country's next European Commissioner. Vălean was subsequently picked to be the European Commissioner for Transport by President of the European Commission Ursula von der Leyen.

In early March 2020, Vălean was appointed by von der Leyen to serve on the commission's special task force to coordinate the European Union's response to the COVID-19 pandemic.

Personal life
Vălean is married to Crin Antonescu and has one child.

References

 Profile at the Chamber of Deputies site

External links
Adina Vălean MEP, official site
European Parliament profile

1968 births
Living people
MEPs for Romania 2007
MEPs for Romania 2007–2009
MEPs for Romania 2009–2014
MEPs for Romania 2014–2019
MEPs for Romania 2019–2024
National Liberal Party (Romania) MEPs
National Liberal Party (Romania) politicians
People from Prahova County
Romanian activists
Romanian European Commissioners
Romanian schoolteachers
Romanian women activists
Spouses of politicians
University of Bucharest alumni
Women European Commissioners
Women MEPs for Romania
21st-century Romanian politicians
European Commissioners 2019–2024